Saint Fructuosus of Tarragona (died 259) was a Christian saint, bishop and martyr.  His is an important name in the early history of Christianity in Hispania.  He was bishop of Tarragona and was arrested during the persecutions of Christians under the Roman Emperor Valerian (reigned 253 – 260).  Along with him were two deacons, St. Augurius and St. Eulogius.  In 259, he was questioned by the praeses Aemilianus and burned at the stake in the local amphitheatre in Tarraco.  The Acta of the martyrdom of the bishop Fructuosus and his deacons Augurius and Eulogius document his legend; they are the earliest Hispanic Acta, "marked by a realistic simplicity which contrasts very favourably with many of the Acta of Diocletian's persecution".

Acta
The text documents the following details. St. Fructuosus, and his deacons were just going to bed when they were arrested. They were examined, at which point they affirmed their belief in the Christian God. They were then sentenced to be burnt. Officers were posted to prevent any sort of disturbance breaking out. They were not completely successful, though, and near the gate of the amphitheatre some of the Christians were able to get close to Fructuosus, and one of them asked him for his prayers. St. Fructuosus replied, in a voice loud enough for everyone to hear, "I am bound to bear in mind the whole universal Church from east to west." He then added some words of consolation and encouragement to the assembled. As the flames rose and enveloped the martyrs, they stretched out their arms, praying to their God until they died.

His Acta are referred to in a hymn by Prudentius and praised and extensively quoted by Augustine of Hippo. The historical list of the bishops of Tarragona, therefore, begins with Fructuosus.

St. Fructuosus' feast day is January 21.

San Fruttuoso abbey on the Italian Riviera is dedicated to St. Fructuosus.

References

Attwater, Donald, and Catherine Rachel John. The Penguin Dictionary of Saints. 3rd edition. New York: Penguin Books, 1993. .

External links
 Catholic Encyclopedia: St. Fructuosus
Saint of the Day, January 21
Henry Wace, A  Dictionary of Christian Biography and Literature: "Fructuosus"
"Sts. Fructuosus, Augurius and Eulogius – A Bishop and His Two Deacons, Martyrs": excerpts of Prudentius' hymn
Butler's Lives of the Saints: St. Fructuosus, Bishop of Tarragona, Martyr, pg. 137

259 deaths
Catalan saints
Saints from Hispania
3rd-century bishops in Hispania
3rd-century Christian martyrs
Year of birth unknown